Lycorhinus is a genus of heterodontosaurid ornithischian dinosaur from the Early Jurassic (Hettangian to Sinemurian ages) strata of the Elliot Formation located in the Cape Province, South Africa.

Description

Lycorhinus, including the remains described by Gow in 1975 as Lanasaurus, is a small ( in length) herbivorous dinosaur despite the long canines it sported in its jaws.

History of discovery

The fossil material consists of dentaries and maxillae, hence the characters mentioned by the name Lycorhinus angustidens that Sidney H. Haughton attributed to the remains in 1924, where the generic name means "wolf snout", as it was at first misidentified as a cynodont, and the specific descriptor means "constricted tooth".

The holotype, SAM 3606, consists of a mandible found by Dr M. Ricono.
Three other species of Lycorhinus have been named. Lycorhinus parvidens was created by Robert Broom and Lycorhinus tucki by Richard Anthony Thulborn in 1970 renaming Heterodontosaurus tucki, but these have failed to find recognition. Lycorhinus consors, named by Thulborn in 1974, was renamed Abrictosaurus by James Hopson in 1975.

Lanasaurus

The type and only species of Lanasaurus is L. scalpridens, described by Christopher Gow in 1975 from the same horizon as Lycorhinus. The generic name is derived from Latin lana, "wool" and Greek saurus, "lizard", and honours Professor Alfred Walter Crompton, nicknamed "Fuzz" because of his woolly hair. The specific name is derived from Latin scalprum, "chisel", and dens, "tooth". It is based on a partial upper jaw bone, the maxilla, holotype BP/1/4244, found in the Upper Elliot Formation of Free State. The teeth show a typical replacement pattern in which during each replacement cycle every third tooth is renewed.

Gow himself in 1990 concluded that the holotype of Lanasaurus was actually a specimen of Lycorhinus angustidens. This has been commonly accepted since.

Classification
L. angustidens is thought to be allied to Heterodontosaurus. Only in 1962 Alfred Walter Crompton recognised it was an ornithischian dinosaur. Thulborn in 1971 created a separate Lycorhinidae but this group was in 1972 equated with Heterodontosauridae by Peter Galton.

References

Heterodontosaurids
Hettangian life
Pliensbachian life
Sinemurian life
Early Jurassic dinosaurs of Africa
Jurassic South Africa
Fossils of South Africa
Fossil taxa described in 1924
Taxa named by Sidney H. Haughton
Ornithischian genera